Adarna House, Inc. is a Philippine company engaged in the publication of local literature for children of all ages. The company is headquartered in Quezon City in metropolitan Manila.

History
During the mid-1970s, the Nutrition Center of the Philippines (NCP), an organization, which primarily addresses malnutrition in the country, recognized not only the physical deficiency of the Filipino children but also the need for a feeding program that would enrich their mental ability. Virgilio S. Almario, a renowned poet and literary critic of that time, was consigned to create series of storybooks for this project. He gathered authors, editors, illustrators, and researchers, which he would call Aklat Adarna.

The Adarna bird is a mythical character known for its ability to cure illnesses with its song. Just like this bird, Aklat Adarna then served education to the Filipinos to heal their illiteracy due to poverty.

Later on, the government organization concluded the program, yet Almario persisted and collaborated with Children's Communication Center (CCC). Adarna Book Services was established to distribute and publish storybooks for CCC. Today, renamed as Adarna House, Inc., the publishing company works with different organizations, producing learning materials for children of all ages, and is continuously reaching out to feed the Filipino minds.

Products

Activity books 
Adarna House Inc. publishes learning tools that can help teachers and parents in guiding their children how to count, color, draw basic figures and identify symbols. Some of the publishing house's activity books are the Sanayang Adarna series, a mixture of coloring, writing, drawing, and counting worksheets, and Magkulay Tayo series which primarily aims to teach children how to hold writing materials.

On its 35th anniversary, Adarna House Inc. published Weewoo, an art activity book which features favorite characters from 35 different books from the company.

Big books 
The classic storybooks published by Adarna House Inc. are also produced in larger formats. These big books are used for storytelling sessions with greater number of audience. The company also produces lesson plan and worksheet compilations that teachers can use as guide to effectively process the story told to the children.

As of 2018, fifty-four (54) big books are being sold in bookstores.

Board Book 
Adarna House Inc. started with a collection of five (5) posters for preschool to help teachers educate the children. In 2007, the company released the Ready for School series, which consists of ten (10) flipbooks with Filipino and English text discussing preschool concepts.

In partnership with Reach Out and Read Philippines, the company published the very first English-Filipino board books in the country.

These board books teaches a child basic words and concepts like colors, numbers, alphabets, position, emotions, and the like. Several board books of Adarna House Inc. today subtly instill Filipino culture in the children's minds- like Kakanin! which features the different Filipino snacks made from rice and Bahay Kubo, the Filipino folk song about vegetables.

More importantly, board books are designed to teach children how to hold a book.

Comics 
In the early 2000s, Adarna House Inc. started an imprint, Anino Comics, which first consisted only of Mythology Class and After Eden by Arnold Arre. On the 35th year of the company, the comic line was revived and six (6) books were published in that year. Four of which, namely Kare-Kare Comics, Janus Silang at Ang Tiyanak ng Tabon, Sixty Six, and Light, were finalists in the National Book Awards by the National Book Development Board (NBDB).

In 2017, Emiliana Kampilan again stirred and challenged Philippine comics upon the release of her book, Dead Balagtas. Its first volume is awarded as the Best Philippine Comics of 2017 by CNN Philippines Life.

Intermediate Readers 
Adarna House published its first teen novellas, Jacobo’s Ghost, Mga Ako, and Sup?, under Pilar Perez Medallion for Young Adult Literature in 2001. In 2014, the company tried to revive the genre and published four (4) new books that year. This includes Supremo and Janus Silang at Ang Tiyanak ng Tabon, which are winners of the National Children's Books Awards. In 2017, the third installment of the Supremo Series was released.

Novels 
Adarna House Inc. publishes translations of classic Filipino novels such as Noli Me Tangere, El Filibusterismo and Florante and Laura. Aside from these, the company also has novels about love, culture, and fantasy. This includes the Janus Silang series, the basis of the graphic novel, which won several awards like Juan C. Laya Prize for Best Novel in a Philippine Language. The e-book version of Woman in a Frame won the 2nd Filipino Readers’ Choice Awards 2013 Novel in English.

Poetry 
Adarna House Inc. teaches children concepts, words and rhymes using poetry books. These books, Buwan, Buwang Bulawan, and May Darating na Trak Bukas are written by renowned writer and National Artist, Rio Alma. The latter was recognized at the 2014 National Children's Book Awards as a Finalist and received the Kid's choice award.

Non-fiction 
Aside from the fictional stories that Adarna is known to offer, the company also has informational materials that discusses more difficult concepts like science. Among these are Can We Live On Mars?, Can We Drink the Ocean?, and Can We Live Without Trees? There are also books that teaches basic information about architecture, history, social studies, food, etc.

Storybooks 
Aklat Adarna published eight (8) pocket-sized and landscape-format storybooks in 1997. The titles included Istorya ni Dodong (The Story of Dodong) in two parts, Si Pilar Katerpilar (Pilar the Caterpillar), and Ang Pag-ibig ni Mariang Makiling (The Love of Mariang Makiling). The titles that are still in print are Digong Dilaw (Yellow Digo), Munting Patak-Ulan (Little Raindrop), Nang Magkakulay ang Nayon (When Color Came to Town), and Si Emang Engkantada at ang Tatlong Haragan (Emang the Enchantress and the Three Rascals).  Nang Magkakulay ang Nayon relaunched in 2010 with English text and a Cebuano translation- a first in Adarna House history.

The first few books by Adarna House Inc. were compilations of short stories in the form of fables, myths, and legends. Later on, there were explorations in characters, settings, and plots. Some of the storybooks that are still being told to today's generation are Ang Barumbadong Bus, Ang Pambihirang Buhok ni Raquel, Ang Mahiyaing Manok and Xilef. Adarna's books do not just teach values- what to do or not to do, but it also challenges the children's minds with the issues presented in each story.

Digital books/ e-books of the publishing house are now also available through the BuriBooks application, where children can read their favorite stories while learning interactively. Applications that are based on books like Ang Pambihirang Buhok ni Raquel and Araw ng Palengke are also made available online by the Adarna House Digital.

Learning Tools 
Adarna House Inc. offers learning tools to help children appreciate and improve on the use of Filipino language. In 2012, the publishing house developed WiKAHON- a box with cards that contains exercises to develop vocabulary and reading comprehension.

The publishing house also produces posters/charts to help children identify figures. There are also manuals to help teachers and parents on storytelling and creating activities to help children process the lesson.

Services 
Adarna House Inc.’s main office is located in Quezon City. The office also serves as a bookshop where people, especially children, can browse and buy the company’s products.

To further reach out to Filipino children, the company participates in book fairs in different schools and institutions.

The publishing house also conducts storytelling session called Kuwentong Adarna, spearheaded by Adarna Group Foundation Inc. (AGFI) and the company’s pool of storytellers. AGFI focuses on engaging with local government units to implement literacy project for children.

Adarna House Inc. also ties with The Raya School to provide progressive learning from preschool to high school.

Adarna House also facilitates summer workshops called Klasrum Adarna, which teaches kids how to write and draw; while workshops for adults, particularly teachers and parents, trains them to story tell, teach beginning reading, and improve the library, among others.

Adarna House Inc. recently launched their Quiz Bee competition, entitled Patinikan sa Panitikan, which is about Filipino literature. The contest is participated by seventy (70) schools nationwide.

They also offer book development services for institutions that would like to commission the production of a book project. The services include copy writing, editing, research, illustration, art direction, and printing.

Awards 
Several of Adarna House's books have won awards in the Philippines and internationally.

Philippine awards and recognition 

Some of Adarna House's books also bear medals awarded to the work prior to publication.

International awards and recognition

Services
Adarna House's main office is located in Quezon City. It has just one other branch in La Trinidad, Benguet. To make up for limited visibility, it holds book fairs in schools and participates in trade fairs throughout the year.

The publishing house is also known for its storytelling sessions, called Kuwentong Adarna.  Facilitated by a member of Adarna House's pool of storytellers, the sessions are done to encourage children to take up the habit of reading.

Apart from storytelling, Adarna House also facilitates numerous workshops for children and adults. Regularly held during summer vacation, Klasrum Adarna for kids offer a variety of writing and illustration classes, while Klasrum offerings for adults include storytelling, teaching beginning reading, and library improvement among others.

Adarna House also offers book development services to individuals and institutions out to commission the production of a book project.  The services include copy writing, editing, research, illustration, art direction, and printing.

Partners
Adarna House works with various organizations to carry out its primary goal "to educate and entertain the Filipino child."

In partnership with DepEd and Ronald McDonald House Charities (RMHC)'s Bright Minds Read!, big books and a collection of lesson plans were developed to help public school teachers use children's literature as a springboard in building reading skills among beginning readers.

The Department of Education (DepEd) and Department of Social Welfare (DSWD) and Development are major partners for the Early Childhood Development Project.  DSWD also worked with Adarna House for Ang Buhay ni Bimboy, a guide for parents and day care workers in nurturing children.

As one of the main proponents of Teens Read, Too! (a year-long reading campaign for Filipino teenagers), the Filipinas Heritage Library has hosted many of the campaign's activities under its roof.  It is through this partnership that the Pilar Perez novellas for young adults were created.

The Meralco Management and Leadership Development Center (MMLDC) Foundation works closely with Adarna House for Lakbay Kalikasan, which promotes environmental awareness through storytelling, puppet shows, and nature trips.

Adarna House serves the Philippine Board on Books for Young People as its Secretariat.  With the logistical assistance of Adarna House, PBBY is able to organize its activities such as the National Children's Book Day celebration, PBBY-Salanga Prize, PBBY-Alcala Prize, and the Salaysayan National Storytelling Competition.

The Reading Association of the Philippines came on board Adarna House's Libro Mo, Libro Ko program to help identify beneficiaries for the program.  For every pledge of donation to these beneficiaries, RAP offers free teacher training and Adarna House comes in with additional book donations.

In 2008, Adarna House and Reach Out and Read-Philippines launched the first bilingual board books in the country during the opening of Aklatang Adarna, a reading corner at the Philippine Children's Medical Center.

Two five-storybook series, Batang Historyador and Batang Katutubo, were completed with United Nations International Children's Fund (UNICEF).

References

External links
Adarna House website

Publishing companies established in 1980
Book publishing companies of the Philippines
Companies based in Quezon City